This is The Coast is a local radio station serving Scarborough, Filey, Whitby and Bridlington.

History 

This is The Coast launched in October 2020 to provide a local radio service for the Yorkshire Coast after the area's previous local station, Yorkshire Coast Radio, became part of a national radio network.

Initially the station launched online and smart speakers before obtaining an Ofcom DAB licence later in the month.

Programming 

The station produces all of its programmes locally with presenter led programming broadcast from 6am to 10pm on weekdays and from 8am to 6pm at the weekend.

Local presenters include Paddy Billington, Tom Hooper, Mike Nicholson, Kev Roberts, Tom Ironside and Matthew Pells.

News 

This is The Coast broadcasts hourly news bulletins, with headlines on the half-hour during weekday breakfast.

The bulletins have a strong local focus with a team of in-house journalists also producing content for the station's website and smartphone app.

National material is provided by Sky News Radio.

Transmission 

This is the Coast can be heard on DAB+ across North Yorkshire on the Muxco multiplex. With transmitters at Oliver's Mount, Bilsdale, Harlow Hill and Acklam Wold

The station is also available online, on its own smartphone apps and on smart speakers.

References 

This
Scarborough, North Yorkshire
Bridlington
Filey
Whitby
Radio stations established in 2020
2020 establishments in England